Carel Nicolaas Storm van 's Gravesande (21 January 1841, Breda - 7 February 1924, The Hague) was a Dutch painter, etcher and lithographer; associated with the Hague School. He is best known for seascapes, interior portraits and still-lifes.

Biography 
He came from an aristocratic family. Although he expressed an early interest in art, his father insisted that he study law. He did so, at the University of Leiden, and graduated in 1865. Three years later, he defied his family's wishes and moved to Brussels, where he studied with Willem Roelofs, Paul Gabriël and Félicien Rops, who taught him etching and became a lifelong friend.

In 1893, he returned to the Netherlands and settled in The Hague, where he became a member of the Hague School, a group of artists who had been heavily influenced by the Barbizon School. He continued to travel, however, with stays in Paris, Wiesbaden (for two years), Cologne and Berlin. In 1900, he was awarded a gold medal at the Exposition Universelle.

He is credited with helping to create a renewal of interest in etching as an independent art form and produced more than 400 etchings; mostly landscapes and cityscapes. With Willem Witsen, he was a co-founder of the "Nederlandse Etsclub" (Dutch Etching Club). His works may be seen in museums around the world, including large institutions like the British Museum and the Detroit Institute of Arts and smaller museums such as the Owens Art Gallery in Sackville, New Brunswick. As a lithographer, he is believed to have been among the first to use aluminum plates, rather than stone or zinc.

Selected works

References

External links 

 
Prints by Storm van 's Gravesande @ the British Museum.
Prints by Storm van 's Gravesande @ the Detroit Institute of Arts.

1841 births
1924 deaths
19th-century Dutch painters
20th-century Dutch painters
Dutch etchers
Dutch lithographers
Dutch male painters
Dutch marine artists
Dutch still life painters
Hague School
People from Breda
19th-century Dutch male artists
20th-century Dutch male artists
20th-century lithographers